The Overseas Automotive Council is a trade group promoting the export of  U.S. automobiles.

History
Industry trade group founded in 1923 as the Overseas Automotive Club by a number of U.S. automobile industry executives to promote and develop the export market for their products. The O.A.C. established an international section in 1960, made up of representatives of non-U.S. auto makers seeking closer business contact with the U.S.

In 1992 the organization changed its name to the Overseas Automotive Council and became the  international aftermarket division of the Motor & Equipment Manufacturers Association (MEMA).

See also
 Hagley Museum and Library

References

External links
 OAC website
 Hagley library catalog for OAC Literature.

Motor trade associations
Automotive industry in the United States
Trade associations based in the United States